Staryye Bogady (İśke Boğaźı) is a rural locality (a selo) and the administrative centre of Arslanovsky Selsoviet, Buzdyaksky District, Bashkortostan, Russia. The population was 547 as of 2010. There are 6 streets.

Geography 
Staryye Bogady is located 15 km northwest of Buzdyak (the district's administrative centre) by road. Arslanovo is the nearest rural locality.

References 

Rural localities in Buzdyaksky District